This is a summary of the year 2020 in British music.

Events
 9 January – Singer Celeste is named as the Sound of 2020, after an annual BBC poll of music critics and industry figures.
 13 January – Opera Holland Park announces simultaneously the scheduled retirement of Michael Volpe as its general director on 30 September 2020, and the appointment of James Clutton as the company's new Chief Executive and Director of Opera, effective 1 October 2020.
 24 January – The London Philharmonic Orchestra announces simultaneously the scheduled retirement of Timothy Walker as its chief executive and artistic director, effective 3 June 2020, and the appointment of David Burke as its next chief executive, along with a planned division into separate roles each of the posts of chief executive and of artistic director.
 1 February
 The Orchestre National de Lille performs the final concert of its UK tour at Leeds Town Hall, the last European orchestra to perform in the United Kingdom just prior to and after the UK's departure from the European Union.
 Veteran glam rock band Slade sack their drummer Don Powell after 50 years together; Powell says he will set up a rival group called "Don Powell's Slade".
 12 February – The Two Moors Festival announces the appointment of Tamsin Waley-Cohen as its new artistic director for its 2020 festival.
 24 February – The Hallé announces Delyana Lazarova as the winner of the inaugural Siemens Hallé International Conductors Competition 2020.
 27 February
 "My Last Breath", sung by James Newman, is selected as the UK's entry for the Eurovision Song Contest 2020. A few weeks later, the contest is cancelled because of the COVID-19 pandemic.
 The Hallé announces the appointment of David Butcher as its next chief executive, effective September 2020.
 The Britten Sinfonia announces that David Butcher is to stand down as its chief executive and artistic director in the summer of 2020.
 11 March
 The Philharmonia Orchestra announces the appointment of Alexander Van Ingen as its next chief executive, effective September 2020.
 The Academy of Ancient Music announces that Alexander Van Ingen is to stand down as its chief executive, effective September 2020.
 17 March – The following classical music organisations announce suspension of performances in the wake of the COVID-19 pandemic:
 All BBC Orchestras and Choirs
 Bournemouth Symphony Orchestra
 Southbank Centre, encompassing the London Philharmonic Orchestra and the Philharmonia Orchestra
 London Symphony Orchestra
 Royal Liverpool Philharmonic Orchestra, through 19 April 2020
 18 March – The Glastonbury Festival announces the cancellation of its 2020 season, in the wake of the COVID-19 pandemic.
 23 March – Hazard Chase announces cessation of activity and entry into voluntary liquidation, in the wake of the COVID-19 pandemic.
 24 March – The St Magnus International Festival announces cancellation of its 2020 season, in the wake of the COVID-19 pandemic.
 26 March – The following festivals have cancelled their scheduled 2020 seasons in the wake of the COVID-19 pandemic:
Download Festival
 East Neuk Festival
Isle of Wight Festival
 27 March – The following festivals have cancelled their scheduled 2020 seasons in the wake of the COVID-19 pandemic:
 All Points East
 C2C: Country to Country
 Lovebox Festival
 Parklife
 Cambridge Folk Festival
 30 March
 The Aldeburgh Festival announces the cancellation of its 2020 festival season, in the wake of the COVID-19 pandemic, the first-ever festival cancellation in the festival's history.
 Following a cold and self-isolation, Marianne Faithfull checks into hospital, and subsequently has tested positive for SARS-CoV-2.
 1 April – The Edinburgh International Festival announces the cancellation of its 2020 festival season, in the wake of the COVID-19 pandemic.
 2 April – The Dartington Music Summer School and Festival announces the cancellation of its 2020 summer school and festival season, in the wake of the COVID-19 pandemic.
 6 April – The London Philharmonic Orchestra announces the appointment of Karina Canellakis as its new principal guest conductor, the first female conductor ever named to the post, effective September 2020.
 24 April – At 99 years old, Captain Tom Moore became the oldest person to top the UK Singles Chart.
 5 May – Glyndebourne Opera announces cancellation of its 2020 summer season, in the wake of the COVID-19 pandemic.
 6 May – Britten Sinfonia announces the appointment of Meurig Bowen as its next chief executive and artistic director, effective August 2020.
 7 May – Help Musicians UK announces the appointment of Dame Evelyn Glennie as its new president.
 12 May – Wigmore Hall and BBC Radio 3 announce a scheduled series of live concerts from Wigmore Hall, beginning on 1 June, to be performed to an empty hall and under social distancing guidelines, the first live concerts from the hall and broadcast on Radio 3 since the general COVID-19 lockdown.
 1 June – At Wigmore Hall, Stephen Hough gives a live concert without an audience in attendance, video-streamed and broadcast on BBC Radio 3, the first live classical music concert in London and the first live music relay on BBC Radio 3 in 11 weeks since the imposition of COVID-19-related lockdown conditions.
 9 June – The Royal Liverpool Philharmonic Orchestra announces the appointment of Domingo Hindoyan as its next chief conductor, effective with the 2021–2022 season.
 15 June – Birmingham Opera Company announces the appointment of Alpesh Chauhan as its new music director, effective 1 July 2020.
 16 June – Universal Music Group announces the re-branding of its Virgin EMI label as EMI Records, and the appointment of Rebecca Allen as president of the EMI Records label.
 25 June – The London Philharmonic Orchestra announces the appointment of Cristina Rocca as its new artistic director, effective November 2020.
 2 July – Opera North announces postponement of its originally scheduled autumn 2020 and winter 2021 productions, in the wake of the COVID-19 pandemic.
 3 July – The BBC Proms announces its reconfigured 2020 Proms season, with 6 weeks of archival Proms and selected new digital content, and the final 2 weeks of the season scheduled to feature live concerts under social distancing guidelines at the Royal Albert Hall.
 4 July – The Bamberg Symphony announces the prize winners of its 2020 Mahler Competition for conductors, which include Finnegan Downie Dear (First Prize) and Harry Ogg (joint winner of Third Prize).
 6 July – Tom Meighan and Kasabian announce his departure from the group, by mutual agreement.  Subsequent reports the next day indicate that the departure was related to Meighan's assault of his former fiancée, Vikki Ager, behaviour condemned by his former bandmates as "totally unacceptable".
 8 July – Cadogan Hall presents a live concert by the English Chamber Orchestra (ECO) under social distancing guidelines, the first live concert at Cadogan Hall and the first live ECO performance since the imposition of lockdown conditions in the wake of the COVID-19 pandemic.
 25 July - Grime artist Wiley is dropped by his management after the rapper posted a series of anti-Semitic tweets.
 28 July - Q magazine folds, and publishes its final issue, blaming low circulation and advertising revenue caused by the COVID-19 pandemic. 
 12 August – Glyndebourne Opera stages the first night of its new live production of Jacques Offenbach's Mesdames de la Halle, in English translation under the title In the Market for Love, or Onions are Forever, under social distancing conditions for the musicians and audience, in the wake of the COVID-19 pandemic.
 17 August – Wigmore Hall announces a schedule for 100 autumn season concerts under social distancing conditions, scheduled for the period of 13 September 2020 to 22 December 2020.
 28 August
 Imogen Cooper is announced as the recipient of The Queens Medal for Music 2019.
 The first live concert of the 2020 BBC Proms takes place at the Royal Albert Hall, featuring the BBC Symphony Orchestra and the BBC Singers conducted by Sakari Oramo, under social distancing conditions for the musicians, without an audience and to an empty hall.
 29 August – Seorsia Jack announces her departure from Real Like You eight months after their win on The X Factor: The Band, deciding to pursue a solo career.
 16 September - The Royal Philharmonic Society awards honorary membership to Dame Sarah Connolly, at a live Wigmore Hall recital.
 6 October – 400 professional classical musicians stage a socially distanced performance protest in support of musicians not covered by the Self-Employment Income Support Scheme (SEISS) grant.
 9 October – Queen's Birthday Honours List 2020
 Donald Runnicles is made a Knight Bachelor.
 Joan Armatrading is made a Commander of the Order of the British Empire.
 John Mark Ainsley, Sally Beamish, Nicholas Daniel, Cathyrn Graham, Tony Hatch, Jan Latham-Koenig, Jeff Lynne, and Muyiwa Olarewaju are each made an Officer of the Order of the British Empire.
 Lurine Cato, Yolanda Charles, Karen Gibson, Carrie Grant, Marianna Hay, Jason Iley, Stephen Layton, Mica Paris, Jennifer Pike, and Dizzee Rascal are each made a Member of the Order of the British Empire.
 Lady Leshurr is awarded the British Empire Medal.
 21 October – NI Opera announces the appointment of Cameron Menzies as its next artistic director.
 1 November – The charity single Four Notes - Paul's Tune, based on a piano improvisation by retired music teacher Paul Harvey, is released in a recording with the BBC Philharmonic accompanying the original piano recording, with proceeds from sales divided equally between the Alzheimers Society and Music for Dementia.	
 4 November – The Southbank Centre announces the appointment of Toks Dada as its new head of classical music, effective December 2020.
 6 November – Sir Cliff Richard becomes the first artist to have albums in the Top 5 UK album charts across eight consecutive decades, each decade from the 1950s (1959) through the 2020s (2020), with the #3 status of Music...The Air That I Breathe this week.
 18 November - The Academy of Ancient Music announces the appointment of Laurence Cummings as its next music director, effective with the 2021–2022 season.
 14 December – Jesy Nelson announces her departure from Little Mix after nine years. Perrie Edwards, Leigh-Anne Pinnock and Jade Thirlwall confirm that they will continue as a three-piece group.
 18 December
 The Choir of Kings College, Cambridge announces the cancellation of its scheduled live performance of the 2020 Festival of Nine Lessons and Carols.  In its place on 24 December, a recording of the music made as an alternative event is to be relayed.
 Paul McCartney releases his solo album McCartney III.
 21 December
 The girl choristers of Ely Cathedral perform the "Hymn for Christmas Day" by Jane Savage, the earliest known Church of England anthem by a female composer, following its re-discovery in the summer of 2020 by Rachel Webber of the University of York.
 Esa-Pekka Salonen is made an honorary KBE by Queen Elizabeth II, for services to music and to United Kingdom-Finland cultural relations.
 30 December: 2021 New Years Honours:
 Jane Glover is made a Dame Commander of the British Empire.
 Graham Vick is made a Knight Bachelor.
 Julian Anderson, Barry Douglas, Daniel Harding, and Wasfi Kani are each made a Commander of the Order of the British Empire.
 Colin Balsam, Natalie Clein, and Wayne Marshall are each made an Officer of the Order of the British Empire.
 Bradley Creswick, Craig David, John Kirkpatrick, and Duncan McDonald are each made a Member of the Order of the British Empire.

Television programmes
1 January – Jools' Annual Hootenanny features Stereophonics, Stormzy, The Selecter, Rick Astley, and others.
4 January 
The Masked Singer, begins on ITV, with contestants including Denise van Outen, Teddy Sheringham and Justin Hawkins.
The Voice UK, series 9, begins on ITV, presented by Emma Willis featuring will.i.am, Sir Tom Jones, Meghan Trainor and Olly Murs as coaches.
8 January – Got What It Takes? returns for its fifth series, hosted by Anna Maynard. The series is won by 13 year old Georgie Mills.
17 January – Stewart Copeland's Adventures in Music features Sting, Bobby McFerrin and Miss Honey Dijon.
11 July – The Voice Kids, series 4, begins on ITV, hosted by Emma Willis.
26 September – Little Mix The Search, series 1, begins on BBC, judged by girl group Little Mix.

Classical works
 Emma-Ruth Richards – The Sail of a Flame
Mark-Anthony Turnage – Towards Alba
 Dani Howard – Dualism
 Thomas Hewitt Jones – Divertimento for String Quartet
 Howard Goodall – Never to Forget
 Hannah Kendall - Tuxedo: Vasco 'de' Gama
 Thomas Adès - Dawn
 Mark-Anthony Turnage – Last Song for Olly
 Roxanna Panufnik - Heartfelt
 Geoffrey Gordon - He saith among the trumpets
 John Paul Jones – The Tudor Pull
 Julia Plaut – 24 Pianos
 Ryan Wigglesworth – Five Waltzes

Opera
 Alex Woolf and David Pountney – A Feast in the Time of Plague

Musical theatre

Film scores and incidental music

Film
Patrick Doyle – Death on the Nile, directed by Kenneth Branagh
Dickon Hinchliffe – Misbehaviour

Television
David Arnold & Michael Price – Dracula
Stephen Rennicks – Normal People

British music awards
Brit Awards – see 2020 Brit Awards
 Gramophone Classical Music Awards 2020
 Chamber: Bartók – Piano Quintet / Veress – String Trio; Vilde Frang; Barnabás Kelemen; Katalin Kokas; Lawrence Power; Nicolas Altstaedt; Alexander Lonquich (Alpha Classics)
 Choral: J.S. Bach – St Matthew Passion; Benjamin Bruns, Damien Guillon, Christian Immler, Toru Kaku, Clint van der Linde, Aki Matsui, Makoto Sakurada, Carolyn Sampson, Zachary Wilder; Bach Collegium Japan; Masaaki Suzuki, conductor (BIS)
 Concerto: Chopin – Piano Concertos; Benjamin Grosvenor; Royal Scottish National Orchestra; Elim Chan, conductor (Decca Classics)
 Contemporary: Thomas Adès - Piano Concerto / Totentanz; Kirill Gerstein, Mark Stone, Christianne Stotijn; Boston Symphony Orchestra; Thomas Adès, conductor (Deutsche Grammophon)
 Early Music: Gesualdo - Madrigali, Libri primo & secondo; Les Arts Florissants; Paul Agnew (harmonia mundi) (Hyperion)
 Instrumental: Beethoven - Complete Piano Sonatas; Igor Levit (Sony Classical)
 Opera: Handel – Agrippina; Joyce DiDonato, Elsa Benoit, Luca Pisaroni, Franco Fagioli, Jakub Józef Orliński, Andrea Mastroni, Carlo Vistoli, Biagio Pizzuti, Marie-Nicole Lemieux; Il Pomo d'Oro; Maxim Emelyanychev, conductor (Erato)
 Orchestral: Mieczysław Weinberg - Symphonies Nos 2 and 21; Gidon Kremer; Kremerata Baltica; City of Birmingham Symphony Orchestra; Mirga Gražinytė-Tyla, conductor (Deutsche Grammophon)
 Recital: Si j'ai aimé (Berlioz, Théodore Dubois; Duparc; Massenet; Saint-Saëns; Vierne); Sandrine Piau; Le Concert de la Loge; Julien Chauvin, director (Alpha Classics)
 Solo Vocal: Janáček - The Diary of One Who Disappeared, Nursery Rhymes, Moravian Folk Poetry in Songs; Nicky Spence; Václava Housková; Victoria Samek; Julius Drake (Hyperion)
 Recording of the Year: Mieczysław Weinberg - Symphonies Nos 2 and 21; Gidon Kremer; Kremerata Baltica; City of Birmingham Symphony Orchestra; Mirga Gražinytė-Tyla, conductor (Deutsche Grammophon)
 Concept Album: From the Ground Up: The Chaconne; Hugo Ticciati; o/modernt (Signum Classics)
 Beethoven 250 Award:  Beethoven – Piano Concertos Nos 2 and 5; Martin Helmchen; Deutsches Symphonie-Orchester Berlin; Andrew Manze, conductor (Alpha Classics)
 Young Artist of the Year: Natalya Romaniw
 Label of the Year: Alpha Classics
 Artist of the Year: Igor Levit
 Orchestra of the Year: The Philadelphia Orchestra
 Special Achievement: Robert von Bahr
 Lifetime Achievement: Itzhak Perlman
 2020 Royal Philharmonic Society Awards
 RPS Gold Medal: John Williams
 Chamber-Scale Composition: Naomi Pinnock, I am, I am
 Concert Series & Events: Venus Unwrapped - Kings Place
 Conductor: Dalia Stasevska
 Ensemble: Scottish Ensemble
 Gamechanger: Jane Glover
 Impact: Sound Young Minds - City of London Sinfonia
 Inspiration: 
 Concerteenies
 Diocese of Leeds Schools Singing Programme
 Stay At Home Choir
 The Opera Story's Episodes
 #UriPosteJukeBox
 Virtual Benedetti Sessions
 Instrumentalist: Lawrence Power
 Large-Scale Composition: Frank Denyer - The Fish that Became the Sun (Songs of the Dispossessed)
 Opera & Music Theatre: The Turn of the Screw - Garsington Opera
 Singer: Natalya Romaniw
 Storytelling: Stephen Hough - Rough Ideas
 Young Artists: Sheku Kanneh-Mason
 Ivors Composer Awards
 Chamber Orchestral: Robin Haigh – Grin
 Choral: Richard Blackford – Pietà
 Community and Participation: Oliver Vibrans – More Up
 Innovation – Yazz Ahmed
 Jazz Composition for Large Ensemble: Charlie Bates – Crepuscule
 Jazz Composition for Small Ensemble: Renell Shaw – The Vision They Had
 Large Chamber: Oliver Leith – Honey Siren
 Large Orchestral: Jonny Greenwood – Horror vacui
 Outstanding Works Collection: Cecilia McDowell
 Small Chamber: Daniel Fardon – Six Movements
 Solo or Duo: Gareth Moorcraft – Diaries of the Early Worm
 Sound Art: Kathy Hinde – Twittering Machines
 Stage Works: Philip Venables – Denis & Katya

Charts and sales

Number-one singles
The singles chart includes a proportion for streaming.

Number-one albums
The albums chart includes a proportion for streaming.

Number-one compilation albums

Year-end charts

Top singles of the year
This chart was published by the Official Charts Company on January 4, 2021

Best-selling albums

Bands formed 
Kaachi
Since September

Bands reformed
Genesis
JLS (first reported in 2019, confirmed in 2020)
Little Man Tate
The Music

Bands disbanded
Lower Than Atlantis
The Montgolfier Brothers
Nizlopi
The Spencer Davis Group

Deaths

7 January – Stephen Clements, radio DJ and presenter (BBC Radio Ulster), 47
13 January – Hylda Sims, poet and folk musician, 87
 16 January – Barry Tuckwell, Australia-born French horn player, conductor, and past principal French horn of the London Symphony Orchestra, 86
 3 February – Eric Parkin, classical pianist, 95
 1 February – Andy Gill, post-punk guitarist (Gang of Four) and record producer, 64
 12 February – Hamish Milne, classical pianist, 80
16 February – Pearl Carr, singer (Pearl Carr & Teddy Johnson), 99
17 February – Andrew Weatherall, music producer (Screamadelica), disc jockey and musician (The Sabres of Paradise, Two Lone Swordsmen), 56 (pulmonary embolism)
12 March – Pete Mitchell, 61, English radio DJ and presenter (BBC Radio 2, Virgin Radio).
14 March – Genesis P-Orridge, singer, musician, poet, performance artist (Throbbing Gristle), (Psychic TV), 70 (leukemia)
 18 March – Sir John Tooley, arts administrator, 95
22 March – Julie Felix, American-born folk singer, 81
 24 March – Gerard Schurmann, Dutch composer resident in the UK, 96
 25 March – Jennifer Bate, classical organist, 75
27 March – Delroy Washington, Jamaican-born reggae singer, 67 (COVID-19)
6 April – Black the Ripper, grime MC, rapper and cannabis activist 32
 8 April – Eileen Croxford Parkhouse, cellist, pedagogue, and founder of the Parkhouse Award, 96
9 April – Dmitri Smirnov, Russian-born composer (Tiriel, The Lamentations of Thel), 71 (COVID-19)
 22 April – Sir Peter Jonas, opera and arts administrator, 73
 29 April – Martin Lovett, cellist and the last surviving member of the Amadeus Quartet, 93
 3 May – Dave Greenfield, singer, songwriter, keyboardist (The Stranglers), 71 (COVID-19)
 6 May – Brian Howe, singer, songwriter (Bad Company), 66 (cardiac arrest)
 7 May – Ty, English rapper, 47 (COVID-19)
 13 May – Derek Lawrence, record producer, 78
 15 May – Phil May, singer (The Pretty Things), 75 (complications following hip surgery)
 3 June – Rosemarie Wright, pianist, 88. (death announced on this date)
 4 June – Steve Priest, bass musician, (Sweet), 72
 5 June – Rupert Hine, musician (Quantum Jump), songwriter and record producer (The Fixx, Howard Jones), 72 (cancer)
 9 June – Paul Chapman, Welsh rock guitarist (UFO, Lone Star), 66
 12 June – Ricky Valance, Welsh singer, 84 (dementia)
 18 June – Dame Vera Lynn, singer, songwriter, and entertainer, 103
 24 June – Jane Parker-Smith, classical organist, 70
 1 July – Ida Haendel, Polish-born violinist, 96
 10 July – Steve Sutherland, disc jockey (Choice FM, Galaxy FM)
 12 July – Judy Dyble, singer-songwriter (Fairport Convention), 71 (lung cancer)
 21 July
Annie Ross, British-American jazz singer (Lambert, Hendricks & Ross), songwriter ("Twisted"), and actress (Superman III), 89 (complications from emphysema and heart disease)
Tim Smith, singer, songwriter, musician (Cardiacs), 59
 25 July
Peter Green, singer-songwriter, guitarist (Fleetwood Mac), 73
CP Lee, English musician (Alberto y Lost Trios Paranoias), 70
 27 July – Denise Johnson, singer, vocalist (Primal Scream), 56
 6 August – Wayne Fontana, singer, (the Mindbenders), 74 (cancer)
 8 August – Erich Gruenberg, Austrian-born violinist and teacher, 95.
 9 August – Martin Birch, music producer and engineer (Deep Purple, Whitesnake, Iron Maiden), 71
 14 August 
Julian Bream, classical guitarist and lutenist, 87
Pete Way, bassist, (UFO), (Waysted), (Fastway), and session bassist for (Michael Schenker Group) and (Ozzy Osbourne), 69
 18 August – Roger Quigley, singer-songwriter, 51
 23 August – Peter King, jazz saxophonist, 80
 25 August – Gerry McGhee, singer (Brighton Rock, 58 (cancer)
 2 September
 John Shrapnell, journalist, singer and actor, 85
 Rinat Ibragimov, Russia-born orchestral double bassist and past principal double bass of the London Symphony Orchestra, 60 (COVID-19)
 5 September – Al G. Wright, band director (Purdue All-American Marching Band), 104
 10 September – Adrian Clarke, classical baritone
 19 September
Lee Kerslake, drummer (Uriah Heep, The Gods, Toe Fat), 73 (prostate cancer)
Dave Kusworth, musician (Jacobites), 60
 26 September – Jimmy Winston, musician (Small Faces) and actor (Doctor Who), 75
 29 September – Justin Connolly, classical composer, 87
 8 October – Brian Locking, rock bass guitarist (The Shadows), 71 (bladder cancer)
 10 October – Dyan Birch, singer (Arrival, Kokomo), 71 (chronic obstructive pulmonary disease)
 16 October – Gordon Haskell, singer-songwriter ("How Wonderful You Are") and musician (King Crimson, The Fleur de Lys), 74 (cancer)
 19 October
Spencer Davis, musician and instrumentalist, (The Spencer Davis Group), 81 (pneumonia)
Tony Lewis, singer-songwriter, musician, (The Outfield), 62
 27 October – James Broad, singer-songwriter, guitarist, (Silver Sun), 50 (bowel cancer)
 30 October – Arthur Wills, organist and composer, 94
 4 November – Ken Hensley, singer-songwriter, musician, producer (Uriah Heep), 75.
 9 November – Robert Layton, classical musicologist and critic, 90
 14 November – Des O'Connor, singer, comedian, television presenter, 88
 18 November – Tony Hooper, singer-songwriter and musician (Strawbs), 77
 3 December – Ron Mathewson, jazz double bassist and bass guitarist, 76 (COVID-19)
 10 December – Kenneth Alwyn, conductor, composer and radio presenter, 95
 20 December
 Dame Fanny Waterman, music teacher and founder of the Leeds International Piano Competition, 84
 Chad Stuart, singer, guitarist and composer (Chad & Jeremy), 79
 24 December – Catherine Ennis, classical organist
 28 December – Fou Ts'ong, China-born classical pianist active in the UK, 86 (COVID-19)

See also 
 2020 in British radio
 2020 in British television
 2020 in the United Kingdom

Notes

References 

 
2020